Sergei Kurashov (– 27 August 1965) was the minister of public health of the USSR from 1959 until his death in 1965. The medical institute in Kazan is named for him. He served as the president of the World Health Organization's World Health Assembly in 1962.

His ashes were buried at the Kremlin Wall Necropolis.

References

1910 births
1965 deaths
Soviet Ministers of Health
Soviet officials of the United Nations
World Health Organization officials
Recipients of the Order of Lenin
Recipients of the Order of the Red Banner of Labour

Burials at the Kremlin Wall Necropolis